Chan Ying Man (born 8 June 1983) is a Hong Kong fencer. She competed in the women's individual foil event at the 2004 Summer Olympics.

References

External links
 

1983 births
Living people
Hong Kong female foil fencers
Olympic fencers of Hong Kong
Fencers at the 2004 Summer Olympics